William S. Jackson (born December 30, 1932) is an American politician. He was a member of the Georgia State Senate from the 24th District, having served from 2007 to 2017. Jackson is a member of the Republican party. He also served in the Georgia House of Representatives from 1979 to 1984, 1987 to 1990 and 1997 to 2002.

References

Living people
Republican Party Georgia (U.S. state) state senators
1932 births
Politicians from Asheville, North Carolina
Republican Party members of the Georgia House of Representatives
21st-century American politicians